Gulfstar Yachts was a large manufacturer of fiberglass sailboats and powerboats built in the Tampa Bay, Florida area from 1970 until 1990 when the Viking Yachts purchased the company's assets. Vince Lazzara, one of pioneers of fiberglass sailboat construction, founded the company. Lazzara had previously been one of the founders of Columbia Yachts. They produced both power from 36 to 72 feet and sailboats from 36 to 63.

History

In 1970, Vince Lazzara emerged from a two-year non-compete clause which had prevented his building fiberglass monohull power and sailboats. He had signed this clause when he sold his share in Columbia Yachts and had been biding his time by building houseboats. Immediately after the non-compete cause expired, Lazzara founded Gulfstar Yachts in the Tampa Bay area. He began building low-priced, low-quality, beamy boats. The hulls were even interchangeable as sailboats or trawlers which minimized production costs. In the mid-1970s, Gulfstar was losing market share. Lazzara, not wanting to leave a legacy as a producer of poor quality yachts reorganized the company, contracted Ted Hood for a number of models and began to produce high-quality, performance yachts also updating and expanding its Sailmaster series. In 1984 Gulfstar began producing the Sailcruiser twin engine motorsailor series producing yachts rivaling that of the best production yachts of the late 70's and mid 80's. The early and mid 80's are now considered Gulfstar's 'Golden Era' of yacht production. By the mid-1980s, as sons Richard and Brad (powerboat fans) became more involved in Gulfstar, their production shifted towards powerboats and away from the performance sailboats. During the mid-1980s Gulfstar also produced a number of performance sailing yachts for the CSY charter boat fleet in the Caribbean.
 
In 1986, Gulfstar and Viking Yachts, a powerboat manufacturer, starting talking about a merger. In 1990, Viking purchased Gulfstar's assets.

Sail

Power

See also
List of sailboat designers and manufacturers
List of boat builders

References

External links
 GulfstarOC.org - an owners' club
 GulfstarOwnersClub.com - another owners' club with a library of information about models

Gulfstar Yachts